Shari Van Belle (born 22 December 1999) is a Belgian footballer who plays as a defender for Women's Super League club OH Leuven and the Belgium women's national team.

Personal life
Van Belle lives in a same-sex relationship with Belgian footballer Nicky Evrard.

References

External links
 

1999 births
Living people
Belgian women's footballers
Women's association football defenders
K.A.A. Gent (women) players
Belgium women's international footballers
Belgium LGBT sportspeople
LGBT association football players
Lesbian sportswomen
21st-century Belgian LGBT people